This is a list of regions of Peru by Human Development Index as of 2023 with data for the year 2021.

See also 

 List of countries by Human Development Index

References 

Regions by Human Development Index
Peru
Peru